The Girl, the Gold Watch & Everything is a 1980 American made-for-television science fiction comedy film based on the 1962 novel of the same name by John D. MacDonald starring Robert Hays and Pam Dawber and directed by William Wiard. The film premiered in syndication on June 13, 1980 as part of Operation Prime Time syndicated programming.

A sequel, The Girl, the Gold Watch & Dynamite, was released in 1981.

Plot
Kirby Winter (Hays) is an easy-going man who meets a free-spirited brunette named Bonny (Dawber) and inherits from his millionaire uncle a gold watch that has the power to stop time.

Cast
 Robert Hays as Kirby Winter
 Pam Dawber as Bonny Lee Beaumont
 Zohra Lampert as Miss Wilma Farnham
 Jill Ireland as Charla O'Rourke
 Ed Nelson as Joseph Locordolos
 Maurice Evans as Mr. Leroy Wintermore
 Peter Brown as Bodyguard
 Larry Hankin as René
 Macdonald Carey as Mr. Walton Grumby
 Burton Gilliam as Hoover Hess

References

External links
 

1980 television films
1980 films
1980s science fiction comedy films
American television films
American science fiction comedy films
Films based on American novels
Operation Prime Time
Paramount Pictures films
Films based on works by John D. MacDonald
Films directed by William Wiard
1980s English-language films
1980s American films
Films shot in San Diego